Lara Stephen (born 1992/1993) is a Welsh beauty pageant titleholder who was crowned as Miss Earth Wales 2015 that gives her the right to represent Wales at Miss Earth 2015.

Pageantry

Miss Earth Wales

Stephen joined Miss Earth Wales 2015. She won the pageant and succeeded Yasmine Alley. The pageant took place on 29 August 2015 at the Burlington Hotel in Birmingham.

Miss Earth 2015

Winning Miss Earth Wales for 2015, Stephen is Wales' representative to be Miss Earth 2015 and would try to succeed Jamie Herrell as the next Miss Earth.

External links
Stephen at Miss Earth UK website

References

British beauty pageant winners
Living people
Miss Earth 2015 contestants
1992 births